Podocarpus atjehensis is a species of conifer in the family Podocarpaceae. It is found in Indonesia and Papua New Guinea.

References

External links
 Podocarpus atjehensis on the Missouri Botanical Garden
 Podocarpus atjehensis on The Plant List

atjehensis
Near threatened plants
Taxonomy articles created by Polbot